Big Battle of Egos was Army of Lovers' seventh (and currently last) album. It was a compilation of previous albums, including four new songs: Rockin' The Ride, Crashing Down, Signed on my Tattoo and Tragedy.  It was released throughout Europe in March 2013.

History 
Army of Lovers reformed with Alexander Bard, Camilla Henemark and Jean-Pierre Barda in late 2012 to enter the Melodifestivalen 2013 with the song "Rockin' the Ride", in hopes of representing Sweden in the Eurovision Song Contest 2013 in Malmö. Their entry did not reach the finals of the Melodifestivalen. Only some days after their performance Alexander Bard explained to the press, that Camilla Henemark was kicked out once again and that Dominika Peczynski returned. The kick-out was followed by a public fight between Alexander Bard and Dominika Peczynski against Camilla Henemark.

A new best-of-compilation, with four new songs, called Big Battle Of Egos was announced for release on March 27, 2013, to be followed by a single and video called Signed On My Tattoo, a duet between Army Of Lovers and fellow Swedes Gravitonas.

New songs 
The four new songs have limited connection to Army of Lovers previous used sound. Except for "Tragedy", all have a strong connection to the electro/dance-sound of Alexander Bard's other bands.

"Signed on My Tattoo" is a duet with his current band Gravitonas, "Crashing Down" is a cover of "Love Came Crashing Down" by Bard’s previous band BWO, and "Tragedy" is also a cover that he wrote for Malena Ernman's La Voix Du Nord album.

Track listing
"Rockin’ The Ride" (3:04)
"Crashing Down" (3:32)
"Signed On My Tattoo" (featuring Gravitonas) (3:45)
"Give My Life" 
"Crucified" 
"Sexual Revolution" 
"My Army of Lovers" 
"Lit De Parade" 
"Obsession" 
"Israelism" 
"Ride the Bullet" 
"I Am" 
"King Midas" 
"La Plage de Saint Tropez"
"Let The Sunshine In"
"Tragedy" (4:09)

Chart performance

References

Army of Lovers compilation albums
2013 compilation albums